The 1980 Women's Olympic Volleyball Tournament  was the 5th edition of the event, organized by the world's governing body, the FIVB in conjunction with the IOC. It was held in Moscow, Soviet Union from 21 to 29 July 1980.

Qualification

* Notes:
1. United States was the 1979 NORCECA Championship runners-up (champions Cuba, were already qualified as World champions), but together with China (1979 Asian champion), Japan (1976 Olympic champion) and other countries, boycotted the games.
2. Brazil, Bulgaria and Hungary replaced China, Japan and the United States.

Format
The tournament was played in two different stages. A single round-robin format was played within each pool to determine the teams position in the pool. The  (second stage) was played in a single elimination format, where the preliminary round two highest ranked teams in each group advanced to the semifinals and the two lowest ranked teams advanced to the 5th–8th place semifinals.

Pools composition

Rosters

Venues
Minor Arena, Moscow, Soviet Union
Druzhba Multipurpose Arena, Moscow, Soviet Union

Preliminary round

Group A

|}

|}

Group B

|}

|}

Final round

5th–8th place
 venue: Druzhba Multipurpose Arena.
 All times are Moscow Summer Time (MSD) (UTC+04:00).

5th–8th place semifinals

|}

7th place match

|}

5th place match

|}

Final
 venue: Minor Arena.
 All times are Moscow Summer Time (MSD) (UTC+04:00).

Semifinals

|}

Bronze medal match

|}

Gold medal match

|}

Final standing

Medalists

References

External links
 Moscow 1980
 Final standings (1964-2000) at FIVB.org
 Official results (pgs. 554-557, 570-577)

Volleyball at the 1980 Summer Olympics
1980 in women's volleyball
Women's volleyball in the Soviet Union
1980 in Soviet women's sport
Vol